Lythrum salicaria or purple loosestrife is a flowering plant belonging to the family Lythraceae. It should not be confused with other plants sharing the name loosestrife that are members of the family Primulaceae. Other names include spiked loosestrife and purple Lythrum. This herbaceous perennial is native to Europe and Asia, and possibly Australia.

Etymology and other names
The generic name Lythrum is derived from the Greek ‘lythron’, meaning blood, in reference to the flower colour in some species. However,  Pliny (A.D.  23-79) stated that Lythrum is named for Lysimachus, an army general and friend of Alexander the Great. ‘’Lysimachus’’ is derived from the Greek ‘’lysis’’, meaning ‘’loosing’’ and ‘’mache’’, meaning strife. 

The specific epithet salicaria derives from the similarity of the leaves to those of willows or Salix species.

The English word loosestrife first appeared in written form in the 16th century. It was coined by English naturalist  William Turner in his 1548 work A New Herball, in which he states: "[The plant] may in englishe be called red loosestryfe or purple loosestryfe."

Purple loosestrife was referred to several times as ‘Long Purples’ by John Clare, such as in his 1821 poem The Wildflower Nosegay:

"Where on the water op’d the lily buds

And fine long purples shadow’d in the lake..."

— Volume II of The Village Minstrel and Other Poems, John Clare, pg. 133

Description
The stems are reddish-purple and square in cross-section.

The flowers are reddish purple,  in diameter, with six petals (occasionally five) and 12 stamens, and are clustered tightly in the axils of bracts or leaves; there are three different flower types, with the stamens and style of different lengths, short, medium or long; each flower type can only be pollinated by one of the other types, not the same type, thus ensuring cross-pollination between different plants. The flowers are visited by many types of insects, and can be characterized by a generalized pollination syndrome.

The fruit is a small  capsule containing numerous minute seeds. Flowering lasts throughout the summer. When the seeds are mature, the leaves often turn bright red through dehydration in early autumn; the red colour may last for almost two weeks. The dead stalks from previous growing seasons are brown.

L. salicaria is very variable in leaf shape and degree of hairiness, and a number of subspecies and varieties have been described, but it is now generally regarded as monotypic with none of these variants being considered of botanical significance. The species Lythrum intermedium Ledeb. ex Colla is also now considered synonymous.

Distribution

Lythrum salicaria is native to Europe, temperate Asia and northwest Africa. It is also naturalised in many temperate parts of the world, including parts of southern Africa, North America, and South America. The species was thought to be a recent introduction to Australia, but pre-colonial pollen samples have been found in New South Wales, indicating another route of introduction; the question is considered unresolved by Australian authorities.

Ecology
Found in ditches, wet meadows and marshes and along sides of lakes. In North America, purple loosestrife can invade sedge meadows.

Associated insects

The flowers are pollinated by long-tongued insects, including bees and butterflies.

A number of insects use Lythrum salicaria as a food resource.

The black-margined loosestrife beetle Galerucella calmariensis is a brown beetle with a black line on its thorax. The adult feeds on the leaves of the plant, producing characteristic round holes. Its larvae destroy tender leaf buds and strip the tissue from the leaves. The golden loosestrife beetle Galerucella pusilla is nearly identical to G. calmariensis, but usually lacks the black thoracic line. Its feeding habits are also quite similar to the other leaf beetle.

The loosestrife root weevil Hylobius transversovittatus is a large red nocturnal weevil, which spends its nights feeding on leaves and leaf buds. The larvae emerge from their eggs and immediately burrow into the root of the plant, which they feed on continuously for over a year. This root damage stunts the plant's growth and ability to create seeds. If several larvae inhabit the same root, the plant can be killed.

The loosestrife flower weevil Nanophyes marmoratus is a tiny weevil which lays a single egg in each flower. When the larvae emerge they eat the flowers' ovaries, and the plant is unable to create seeds. The larvae usually proceed to hollow out the flower buds and use them as safe places to pupate.

Caterpillars of the engrailed moth (Ectropis crepuscularia), a polyphagous geometer moth, also feed on purple loosestrife.

Cultivation, uses and impact
It has been used as an astringent medicinal herb to treat diarrhea and dysentery; it is considered safe to use for all ages, including babies. It is also cultivated as an ornamental plant in gardens, and is particularly associated with damp, poorly drained locations such as marshes, bogs and watersides. However, it will tolerate drier conditions. The flowers are showy and bright, and a number of cultivars have been selected for variation in flower colour, including:
 'Atropurpureum' with dark purple flowers
 'Brightness' with deep pink flowers
 'Happy' with red flowers on a short stem
 'Purple Spires' with purple flowers on a tall stem
 'Roseum Superbum' with large pink flowers.

The cultivars ‘Blush’ with blush-pink flowers, and 'Feuerkerze' with rose-red flowers have gained the Royal Horticultural Society's Award of Garden Merit.

It has also been introduced in many areas of North America by bee keepers, due to its abundance of flowers which provide an important source of nectar.

As an invasive species

The purple loosestrife has been introduced into temperate New Zealand and North America where it is now widely naturalised (spreading on its own) and officially listed in some controlling agents. Infestations result in dramatic disruption in water flow in rivers and canals, and a sharp decline in biological diversity as native food and cover plant species, notably cattails, are completely crowded out, and the life cycles of organisms from waterfowl to amphibians to algae are affected.

A single plant may produce up to 2.7 million tiny seeds annually. Easily carried by wind and water, the seeds germinate in moist soils after overwintering. The plant can also sprout anew from pieces of root left in the soil or water. Once established, loosestrife stands are difficult and costly to remove by mechanical and chemical means.

Plants marketed under the name "European wand loosestrife" (L. virgatum) are the same species despite the different name. In some cases the plants sold are sterile, which is preferable.

In North America, purple loosestrife may be distinguished from similar native plants (e.g., fireweed Chamerion angustifolium, blue vervain Verbena hastata, Liatris Liatris spp., and spiraea (Spiraea douglasii) by its angular stalks which are square in outline, as well as by its leaves, which are in pairs that alternate at right angle and are not serrated.

Biological control
Purple loosestrife provides a model of successful biological pest control. Research began in 1985 and today the plant is managed well with a number of insects that feed on it. Five species of beetle use purple loosestrife as their natural food source, and they can do significant damage to the plant. The beetles used as biological control agents include two species of leaf beetle: Galerucella calmariensis and Galerucella pusilla; and three species of weevil: Hylobius transversovittatus, Nanophyes breves, and Nanophyes marmoratus. Infestations of either of the Galerucella species is extremely effective in wiping out a stand of purple loosestrife, defoliating up to 100% of the plants in an area. The moth Ectropis crepuscularia is polyphagous and a pest species itself, and unsuitable for biological control.

References

External links 

 Invading Species.com Ontario Ministry of Natural Resources and Ontario Federation of Anglers and Hunters
 Species Profile - Purple Loosestrife (Lythrum salicaria), National Invasive Species Information Center, United States National Agricultural Library. Lists general information and resources for Purple Loosestrife.

salicaria
Flora of Europe
Flora of temperate Asia
Flora of tropical Asia
Flora of North Africa
Flora of Queensland
Flora of South Australia
Flora of Tasmania
Flora of Victoria (Australia)
Myrtales of Australia
Plants described in 1753
Taxa named by Carl Linnaeus